, also known as , was a samurai who fought in the Hōgen Rebellion of 1156. He was the son of Minamoto no Tameyoshi, and brother to Yukiie and Yoshitomo.

Tametomo is known in the epic chronicles as a powerful archer and it is said that he once sunk an entire Taira ship with a single arrow by puncturing its hull below the waterline. It is also added in many legends that his left arm was about 4 inches longer than his right, enabling a longer draw of the arrow, and more powerful shots.  He fought in the Siege of Shirakawa-den, along with his father, against the forces of Taira no Kiyomori and Minamoto no Yoshitomo, his brother. The palace was set aflame, and Tametomo was forced to flee.  

After the Hōgen Rebellion, the Taira cut the sinews of Tametomo's left arm, limiting the use of his bow, and then he was banished to the island of Ōshima in the Izu Islands. Tametomo eventually killed himself by slicing his abdomen, or committing seppuku. He is quite possibly the first warrior to commit seppuku in the chronicles.

During the Edo period, a descendant of Tametomo named  was involved in the 1754 Hōreki River incident.

References

1139 births
1170 deaths
Minamoto clan
Suicides by seppuku
People of Heian-period Japan